Pedro Manuel Ávila (born January 14, 1997) is a Venezuelan professional baseball pitcher for the San Diego Padres of Major League Baseball (MLB). He made his MLB debut in 2019.

Career

Washington Nationals
Ávila signed as an international free agent by the Washington Nationals in 2014. He made his professional debut in 2015, and  played for the Rookie-level DSL Nationals and the Rookie-level Gulf Coast Nationals, going 7–3 with a 2.12 ERA in 63.2 innings. He played for the Class A Hagerstown Suns in 2016, going 7–7 with a 3.48 ERA in 93 innings.

San Diego Padres
On December 2, 2016, Ávila was traded to the San Diego Padres in exchange for Derek Norris.  

In 2017, Ávila split the season between the Single-A Fort Wayne Tin Caps and the High-A Lake Elsinore Storm. He accumulated a 8–5 record with a 3.70 ERA in 128.1 innings, and finished the season with 170 strikeouts, the most by a Padres minor leaguer that season.  In 2018, he pitched the full season in Lake Elsinore, making 20 starts with a 4.27 ERA and striking out 142 batters in 130.2 innings.  

The Padres added him to their 40-man roster after the 2018 season. He opened the 2019 season with the Amarillo Sod Poodles of the Double-A Texas League. On April 11, 2019, he was promoted to the major leagues for the first time. In a start versus the Arizona Diamondbacks, he went  innings and allowed one run while recording five strikeouts in his debut. He became to the first player in Sod Poodle history to reach MLB. He was optioned back to Amarillo on April 12. Ávila suffered an elbow injury in August and underwent Tommy John surgery in September 2019.

Ávila was designated for assignment on November 27, 2019. He was non-tendered on December 2 and became a free agent. He re-signed with San Diego the next day on a minor league contract.

San Diego selected his contract to the active roster on October 1, 2021. He made 2 appearances for San Diego, logging a 4.50 ERA with 5 strikeouts. On June 6, 2022, Ávila was removed from the 40-man roster and sent outright to the Triple-A El Paso Chihuahuas. He made 30 appearances (24 starts) for the affiliate, recording a 7-2 record and 4.58 ERA with 124 strikeouts in 112.0 innings pitched.

On November 10, 2022, the Padres selected his contract onto the 40-Man roster. Ávila was optioned to Triple-A El Paso to begin the 2023 season.

See also
 List of Major League Baseball players from Venezuela

References

External links

1997 births
Living people
Baseball players from Caracas
Venezuelan expatriate baseball players in the United States
Major League Baseball players from Venezuela
Major League Baseball pitchers
San Diego Padres players
Dominican Summer League Nationals players
Venezuelan expatriate baseball players in the Dominican Republic
Gulf Coast Nationals players
Hagerstown Suns players
Arizona League Padres players
Fort Wayne TinCaps players
Lake Elsinore Storm players
Amarillo Sod Poodles players
Bravos de Margarita players
San Antonio Missions players
El Paso Chihuahuas players